Natanael de Souza Santos Junior (25 December 1985), simply known as Júnior Santos, is a Brazilian footballer who currently plays as striker for Chapecoense. Júnior is from Mortugaba in the state of Bahia, Brazil.

Club career

Jeju United
On 9 February 2010, Júnior joined Jeju United. In his first season with the Jeju, Júnior scored 12 league goals and had four assists and added four goals and an assist in the Pillage Cup.

Wuhan Zall
On 12 February 2013, Wuhan Zall's owner Yan Zhi announced that Júnior will join their team for Chinese Super League season 2013. After playing 14 league matches without scoring, he transferred to K League 1 side Suwon Samsung Bluewings on 13 July 2013.

Career statistics

References

External links 
 
 

1985 births
Living people
Brazilian footballers
Brazilian expatriate footballers
Jeju United FC players
Wuhan F.C. players
Suwon Samsung Bluewings players
K League 1 players
Expatriate footballers in South Korea
Brazilian expatriate sportspeople in South Korea
Expatriate footballers in China
Brazilian expatriate sportspeople in China
Chinese Super League players
Association football forwards